Alipta crenistria is a species of very small sea snail, a marine gastropod mollusc in the family Cerithiopsidae.

References

Cerithiopsidae
Gastropods of New Zealand
Gastropods described in 1907